The Public Transport Authority (ZTM Warszawa), branded as Warsaw Public Transport (WTP), is a local authority controlled body managing all means of public transport in Warsaw. The public transport companies running the lines governed by the ZTM are:
 Warsaw Trams
 Municipal Bus Company
 Warsaw Metro
 Fast City Rail
It also carries out tasks related to the implementation, management and operation of Veturilo, Warsaw's public bicycle-sharing system.

In addition to the above, ZTM contracts out some of the bus services to private companies. These include PKS Grodzisk Mazowiecki, Arriva Bus Poland, Europa Express City, Mobilis, KM Łomianki and ITS Michalczewski (until 2016).

ZTM operates an integrated ticketing system based on proof-of-payment and a variety of single-use, time-limited, and long-term ticket types valid across tram, bus, rail, and metro lines.

ZTM is a member of the European Metropolitan Transport Authorities (EMTA) and the International Association of Public Transport (UITP).

Operations

Metro 

ZTM manages Metro Warszawskie Sp. z o.o., which operates the Warsaw Metro, an urban rapid transit rail system. Service is provided by 324 carriages, forming up to 54 trains of six carriages each. As of June 2020, the system comprises two lines with 33 stations and a total length of 36 kilometers (22 mi).

Buses 

Warsaw's bus system is divided between several companies, including Miejskie Zakłady Autobusowe (MZA), Europa Express City, Mobilis, PKS Grodzisk Mazowiecki and Arriva Bus Transport Polska. Only MZA and KM Łomianki are owned by the city.

Trams 

The Tramwaje Warszawskie company, managed by ZTM, operates a tram network comprising 26 tram lines and measuring 131 kilometers in length. Tram service is provided by 810 carriages, of which 58% are modern low floor carriages. The routes are currently undergoing further expansion.

Commuter rail 

Szybka Kolej Miejska (SKM; lit. Fast City Rail) provides local commuter rail services in the Warsaw metropolitan area, on already existing railway routes managed by PKP Polskie Linie Kolejowe. The company was originally incorporated as a joint venture between the City of Warsaw, Metro Warszawskie, and Tramwaje Warszawskie, with 50%, 49%, and 1% of the company's shares, respectively.

Rail transport is the fastest means of transportation in the agglomeration, reaching a commercial speed of around 40 km/h.

Veturilo 
Veturilo, Warsaw's bike rental system, was launched in 2012. The system currently offers over 3 thousand bicycles in 204 rental stations. In 2015, the system was used by 375 thousand users.

Fares 

The Warsaw area is split into two fare zones. Zone 1 is the central part of the city, while zone 2 covers the rest of the Warsaw area. Tickets can be purchased for zone 1 only, or for both zones; fares have a price difference between these zones.

ZTM offers several different types of tickets. Single tickets are valid for 75 minutes (zone 1 only) or 90 minutes (both zones) from the time they are validated, and permit unlimited transfers during their validity. For shorter journeys, 20-minute tickets valid for both zones are available. Daily and 3-day passes are valid for 24 and 72 hours from the time they are validated, respectively. Weekend passes are valid from 7:00 PM on Fridays to 8:00 AM on Mondays. Groups of up to ten people may purchase discounted single tickets valid in zone 1 only, and groups of up to five people may purchase discounted weekend passes. 30- and 90-day passes are also available.

Tickets are valid on all buses, trams, Metro and SKM trains. Daily passes and longer are also valid on Warszawska Kolej Dojazdowa (WKD) and Koleje Mazowieckie trains within the ZTM area, and also include parking at ZTM-operated park and ride facilities. 30- and 90-day passes are only available on ZTM's contactless smartcard, the Warszawska Karta Miejska (WKM; English: Warsaw City Card); all other tickets are paper tickets encoded with a magnetic stripe.

As of April 2017, fares are as follows (all prices in Polish złoty):

30- and 90-day passes, and pre-validated 20-minute and single tickets, are available at ticket machines on buses, trams, and SKM trains; these machines only accept credit cards. Otherwise, tickets must be purchased prior to boarding, either online, at ZTM customer service points, or at ticket machines and retail outlets located throughout the city. These tickets must then be validated upon starting a journey; the method for doing so depends on where the journey begins. On buses, trams, and SKM trains, validators are located on board; passengers must validate their tickets immediately after boarding. On the Metro, validators are built into ticket barriers; since lifts to platforms are usually located outside the barriers, they have freestanding validators installed next to them. Validators are also located at some railway stations; passengers boarding Koleje Mazowieckie trains at stations without validators must board at the first carriage and speak to the driver, who will manually validate their ticket. In any case, the ticket will then have a date and time stamp printed on it by the validator, or written on it by the driver. Passengers traveling with a WKM must scan the card at a validator each time they board a vehicle to validate their pass.

All public transport in Warsaw operates on a proof-of-payment system. Fare inspectors (Polish: kontrolerzy biletów) randomly check tickets on vehicles and in Metro stations' paid areas. Passengers traveling without a valid ticket or WKM are charged a fine of 266 zł. This fine is reduced to 159.60 zł if paid immediately to the inspector, or 186.20 zł if paid to ZTM within one week.

Chief executive officers

See also 
 Transport in Warsaw

External links 

 Warszawski Transport Publiczny (passenger site)
 ZTM Warszawa (corporate site)

References

Public transport in Poland
Transport in Warsaw
Companies based in Warsaw
1992 establishments in Poland